Goshen is a census-designated place (CDP) near Visalia, in Tulare County, California, United States. The population was 3,006 at the 2010 census, up from 2,394 at the 2000 census. Until the twentieth century, Goshen was an island in a marsh at the edge of Tulare Lake, formerly the largest freshwater lake west of the Great Lakes until drained.

History 

Goshen was founded in the 1870s. The Central Pacific Railroad was expanding which continued with a branch line from Goshen to Visalia in 1874. In the early 1890s, Chris Evans and John Sontag robbed a Southern Pacific Railroad train at Goshen.

On January 16, 2023, six people, including a ten-month-old baby, were killed in a mass shooting at a house by alleged cartel gang members.

Geography

Demographics

2010
The 2010 United States Census reported that Goshen had a population of 3,006. The racial makeup of Goshen was 1,186 (39.5%) White, 76 (2.5%) African American, 90 (3.0%) Native American, 11 (0.4%) Asian, 1 (0.0%) Pacific Islander, 1,496 (49.8%) from other races, and 146 (4.9%) from two or more races. Hispanic or Latino of any race were 2,482 persons (82.6%).

The Census reported that 3,006 people (100% of the population) lived in households, 0 (0%) lived in non-institutionalized group quarters, and 0 (0%) were institutionalized.

There were 773 households, out of which 441 (57.1%) had children under the age of 18 living in them, 384 (49.7%) were opposite-sex married couples living together, 156 (20.2%) had a female householder with no husband present, 93 (12.0%) had a male householder with no wife present.  There were 82 (10.6%) unmarried opposite-sex partnerships, and 8 (1.0%) same-sex married couples or partnerships. 101 households (13.1%) were made up of individuals, and 33 (4.3%) had someone living alone who was 65 years of age or older. The average household size was 3.89.  There were 633 families (81.9% of all households); the average family size was 4.19.

The population was spread out, with 1,074 people (35.7%) under the age of 18, 328 people (10.9%) aged 18 to 24, 843 people (28.0%) aged 25 to 44, 557 people (18.5%) aged 45 to 64, and 204 people (6.8%) who were 65 years of age or older.  The median age was 27.1 years. For every 100 females, there were 107.3 males.  For every 100 females age 18 and over, there were 106.0 males.

The homeowner vacancy rate was 2.4%; the rental vacancy rate was 10.0%.  1,526 people (50.8% of the population) lived in owner-occupied housing units and 1,480 people (49.2%) lived in rental housing units.

2000
As of the census of 2000, there were 2,394 people, 593 households, and 507 families residing in the CDP. The racial makeup of the CDP was 62.99% White, 2.80% African American, 2.05% Native American, 1.38% Asian, 26.90% from other races, and 3.88% from two or more races. Hispanic or Latino of any race were 73.14% of the population.

There were 593 households, out of which 47.4% had children under the age of 18 living with them, 57.5% were married couples living together, 18.4% had a female householder with no husband present, and 14.5% were non-families. 10.8% of all households were made up of individuals, and 3.9% had someone living alone who was 65 years of age or older.  The average household size was 3.98 and the average family size was 4.21.

In the CDP, the population was spread out, with 37.4% under the age of 18, 12.1% from 18 to 24, 27.1% from 25 to 44, 17.5% from 45 to 64, and 6.0% who were 65 years of age or older.  The median age was 25 years. For every 100 females, there were 97.5 males.  For every 100 females age 18 and over, there were 101.6 males.

The median income for a household in the CDP was $28,301, and the median income for a family was $27,962. Males had a median income of $25,781 versus $16,905 for females. The per capita income for the CDP was $8,837.  About 26.7% of families and 28.4% of the population were below the poverty line, including 35.1% of those under age 18 and 25.5% of those age 65 or over.

Government

In the United States House of Representatives, Goshen is in

References

Census-designated places in Tulare County, California
Census-designated places in California
Stagecoach stops in the United States
Butterfield Overland Mail in California